"In the Dark" is a song recorded by DJ Tiësto with vocals from Christian Burns released in March 2007. This song is off the album Elements of Life. The song was composed by Christian Burns, Tiësto and D.J. Waakop Reijers-Fraaij.

Formats and track listings

CD, Maxi

12" Vinyl

Promo

Release history

Charts

Weekly charts

Year-end charts

References

2007 singles
Tiësto songs
Songs written by Tiësto